Michel Ameller (1 January 1926 – 28 September 2022) was a French government official. He was a member of the Constitutional Council from 1995 to 2004.

Biography
Ameller studied at the Algiers Faculty of Law. He was General Secretary of the National Assembly from 1985 to 1992, spending his entire career at the Palais Bourbon beginning in 1952. He was the father of architect  and photographer Thierry Ameller.

Ameller died in Paris on 28 September 2022, at the age of 96.

Decorations
Grand Officer of the Legion of Honour
Grand Cross of the Ordre national du Mérite
Commander of the Order of Francisco de Miranda
Commander of the Order of the Liberator

References

1926 births
2022 deaths
French jurists
Grand Officiers of the Légion d'honneur
Grand Cross of the Ordre national du Mérite
Deputies of the 8th National Assembly of the French Fifth Republic
Deputies of the 9th National Assembly of the French Fifth Republic
University of Algiers alumni
Sciences Po alumni
Pieds-Noirs
People from Aïn Defla Province